Ravikant and Ravikanth are given names of Indian origin. People with those names include:

 Ravikant Nagaich (1931–1991), Indian film personality
 Ravikanth (actor) (born 1962), Indian actor
 Ravikanth Perepu (active from 2013), Indian film screenwriter and director
 Ravikant Shukla (born 1987), Indian cricketer
 Ravikant Singh (born 1994), Indian former cricketer

See also
 Naval Ravikant, Indian American entrepreneur
 Ravi Kant (disambiguation)